The 2017 Metro Manila Film Festival (MMFF) is the 43rd edition of the annual Metro Manila Film Festival held in Metro Manila and throughout the Philippines. It is organized by the Metropolitan Manila Development Authority (MMDA). During the festival, no foreign films are shown in Philippine theaters (except IMAX, 4D, and large format 3D theaters).

The festival began with the traditional Parade of Stars (Filipino: Parada ng mga Artista) on December 23, 2017. Unlike the previous editions, which held its parade in Manila, the 2017 parade was held in Muntinlupa to celebrate the centennial of the city's founding as a municipality.

Launch and reform

The 2017 Metro Manila Film Festival was formally launched on March 7, 2017. As part of the launch ceremony, changes to the composition of the MMFF Executive Committee were announced. The changes were made in a bid to include more sectors of the film industryrepresentatives from the academe, government, media, and private sector professionals.

Among the changes were the removal of Moira Lang and Ed Cabangot, who reportedly favor independent films, and the addition of representatives from theater chains. The best practices from the film entries selection criteria used for the previous edition will be adopted into the selection process of the 2017 edition with MMFF Chairman Thomas Orbos saying that the film festival will feature a film roster that are of "quality and box office potential".

New rules and regulations were introduced in the 2017 edition. This year's edition reintroduced the script submission which was the regulation prior to the 2016 edition. The festival committee will now select four scripts and four finished films that will completely make up the Magic 8. The selection criteria were also revised to reintroduce the controversial "commercial appeal/viability". The MMFF Executive Committee was criticized for these as it was alleged that the reintroduction of these old rules was made to accommodate the big mainstream studios that were mostly left out last year. This move was seen as a way to prioritize box-office success over quality films. After the announcement of the first four official entries from the script submissions, three members of the MMFF Executive Committee, namely, Ricky Lee, Rolando Tolentino and Kara Magsanoc-Alikpala, resigned due to failure to continue the reforms that occurred in the 2016 edition. In a joint statement, the three former members stated that they did not agree on the MMFF Execom "putting too much emphasis on commerce over art" and they also explained that the first four entries did not affect their decision to leave as they're planning to leave long before the announcement of these entries. Another MMFF Execom member, Ed Lejano, resigned only days after. The first three resigned members were replaced by Maryo J. de los Reyes, Joy Belmonte-Alimurung and Arnell Ignacio. The remaining fourth slot is kept open for representatives of the independent cinema.

Entries

Feature films
The first four films were announced on June 30, 2017, representing the Magic 8, by using the script submission method. The last four official entries were announced on November 17, 2017, completing the list of 8 official entries. Of all the 26 submitted entries, 8 were chosen for the said film festival:

Short films
Aspirant producers had until September 1, 2017 to submit entries for the Short Film category. The eight short film entries were announced in November 2017. Two of the entries were animated films, Kinalimutan Natin ang mga Bata and Noel.

Rejected and unsubmitted entries

26 scripts for candidate film entries were submitted to the MMFF Executive Committee. Among these potential entries four films were accepted as the first official four entries. The following films had their scripts submitted to the film festival organizers but their entries were not accepted.

Ang Bomba ni Ginger Paloma by Antoinette Jadaone
Buy Bust by Erik Matti  
Deadma Walking by Julius Alfonso 
Ang Larawan by Loy Arcenas 
My Fairy Tail Love Story by Perci Intalan
Ang Sikreto ng Piso by Perry Escaño

Other films reportedly has expressed interest to enter the 2017 MMFF prior to the announcement of the first four official entries:

Bagtik by Chito Roño 
Blood Hunters: Rise of the Hybrids by Vincent Soberano
Smaller and Smaller Circles by Raya Martin
The Significant Others by Joel Lamangan
Tuwa, Luha, Saya: Memoirs of Timog by Roderick Lindayag

The following films were reportedly submitted after the first four official entries were announced:

Journeyman Finds Home: The Simone Rota Story by Albert Almendralejo and Maricel Cariaga
Citizen Jake by Mike de Leon reportedly attempted to enter the film festival through the script method but it was clarified that the film may be submitted in its finished form at a later date. Due to issues of corruption within the festival committee, director Mike de Leon decided to cancel his entry for the festival.

Parade of Stars

The traditional Parade of Stars which featured floats of the film festival's eight entries took place in Muntinlupa instead of the traditional route on Roxas Boulevard in Manila proper. The organizers made the decision in order to give opportunity to other local government units of Metro Manila to host the customary event. The parade was also done as part of Muntinlupa's centennial on its foundation as a municipality on December 19, 1917.

The route of the parade began south of the city at the Muntinlupa Sports Complex and ended at the Filinvest Event Grounds in the barangay of Alabang. The route's scope included Buendia Street, Centennial Avenue, and the National Road.

Awards

The Gabi ng Parangal of the 2017 Metro Manila Film Festival was held on December 27, 2017 at the Kia Theatre in Quezon City.

Major awards
Winners are listed first, highlighted in boldface, and indicated with a double dagger. Nominations are also listed if applicable.

Other awards
Male Star of the Night – Derek Ramsay
Female Star of the Night – Erich Gonzales

Short Film category
Best Picture – Anong Nangyari kay Nicanor Dante?
People's Choice Award – Noel

Multiple awards

Box office gross
A week prior to the start of the Metro Manila Film Festival it was agreed upon that the disclosure of sales record of all 8 entries will be prohibited. The organizers announced that the gross sales of the first and second day has surpassed the figures of the 2015 edition. On January 8, 2017, the MMFF executive committee announced that the total box office gross for all 8 entries surpassed  and decided to extend the screening of MMFF films in select cinemas beyond January 7, 2018.

References

Metro Manila Film Festival
MMFF
MMFF
MMFF
MMFF
MMFF
December 2017 events in the Philippines
January 2018 events in the Philippines